Christina Sakala (born 28 January 1993) is a Zambian model. She represented Zambia at the 2015 Top model of the world competition in Egypt at the age of 21.

Early life
Christina Sakala was born in Lusaka, the capital of Zambia where she grew up in a family with 7 siblings. Her parents separated when she was young.
She attended the Roma Girls secondary school and continue her studies at the University of Lusaka and Cavendish university where she studied law degree.

Career
Sakala first started modeling at the age of 21 when she took part in a SBM fashion show. She became a household name after participating  in an audition organized by Pink Diamond International Model Academy and Mumba Children Project, she was selected to represent Zambia at the Top model of the world  pageant. In 2017, she represented zambia at the Miss Globe 2017 pageant but did not compete. She walked the runway at the shanghai black fashion week in 2017 where she showcase designs by young zambian designers Chishimba Katongo and Karen Shula. Throughout her career, she has worked  with a number of local models and designers including Kapasa musonda, Chiza Ngulube, Chisoma Lombe, Donalia Notando, Kabaso Nkandu, Cecilia Njovu and Juliet Jacobs, Natasha Mapulanga, Kunda Kakoma, Tracy Kaoma, Joshua Nyirenda and  Cypatrick. She has also worked for brands including telecommunication company airtel.

References

http://socialitezed.com/2018/06/03/pics-fashion-notes-with-christina-tintin-sakala/

1993 births
Living people
Zambian models